The 2022–23 Burundi Ligue A season, also known as the Primus Ligue for sponsorship reasons, is the 60th edition of the top flight football competition in Burundi. The season began on 12 August 2022 and is scheduled to conclude in May 2023. Flambeau du Centre is the defending champion.

Teams 
A total of sixteen clubs participate in this season. Thirteen teams from previous season and three new promoted sides.

Promoted from Ligue B
 Inter Star
 Tigre Noir Ruyigi
 Magara Young Boys

Relegated from Ligue A
 Les Crocos
 Flambeau de l'Est
 Royal de Muramvya

Stadiums and locations

League table

Results 
</onlyinclude>

References

Burundi Premier League seasons
Premier League

Burundi
Burundi